Jesse Grimes  (1788–1866) was a Texas pioneer and politician. Before moving to Texas, he fought in the War of 1812. He was a signer of the Texas Declaration of Independence. He served as Senator in the Republic of Texas Congress and in the Texas State Legislature. Grimes County was named in his honor.

Early life and family
Grimes was born in what is now Duplin County, North Carolina, on February 6, 1788, to Sampson and Bethsheba Grimes.  In the War of 1812, he served in an Infantry Company in the West Tennessee Militia. He married his first wife, Martha Smith, in 1813. The family moved to Washington County, Alabama, in 1817. Martha died during childbirth in 1824. They had nine children. He married Mrs. Rosanna Ward Britton in 1826. They had six children.

Life and career in Texas

Grimes then moved to Stephen F. Austin's second colony in what is now Grimes County, Texas, in 1826.

On March 21, 1829, Grimes was elected by the ayuntamiento of San Felipe de Austin as first lieutenant of the First Company, Battalion of Austin. He was elected sindico procurador (city attorney)  of the Viesca precinct in December 1830 and in December 1831 was elected a regidor (city councilman). On October 5, 1832, he became a member of Viesca district's subcommittee of safety and vigilance. On October 6, he was appointed district treasurer.

During the Republic of Texas period, Jesse Grimes was the first Chief Justice for Montgomery County, in 1838. The following year, he settled on what is now Grimes Prairie in Grimes County.

Texas Revolution
He represented Washington Municipality as a delegate to the Texas Convention of 1833 and the Texas Consultation of 1835. On November 14, 1835, he was elected to the General Council of the provisional government.

Grimes served as Washington Municipality's representative to the Texas Republic's Constitutional Convention of 1836 at Washington-on-the-Brazos, Texas at which he signed the Texas Declaration of Independence.

On June 3, 1836, he formed a volunteer company in the Republic of Texas Army.

Texas state senator
He served as Senator from Washington County in the First Congress of the Republic of Texas from October 3, 1836, to September 25, 1837.

He served in the Sixth and Seventh sessions of the Republic of Texas's House of Representatives as the member from Montgomery County. He completed Robert M. Williamson's unexpired term in the Eighth Congress, representing Washington, Montgomery, and Brazos counties, and was elected to the Ninth Congress, which ended on June 28, 1845.

After Texas became a state, he served as  state senator in the First, Second, Third, and Fourth Texas Legislatures. He served as President pro tempore of the Texas State Senate in the First Called Session of the Fourth Texas Legislature, in the Regular and Adjourned Sessions of the  Sixth Texas Legislature, and  all three sessions of the Eighth Texas Legislature.

Death and legacy
Grimes died on March 15, 1866, and was buried in the John McGinty cemetery, east of Navasota, Texas. His remains and those of his second wife were moved to the Texas State Cemetery on October 17, 1929.
Grimes County, Texas was named in his honor.

See also

 Timeline of the Republic of Texas
 History of Texas
 Congress of the Republic of Texas
 Texas Revolution

References

External links
 
 

Republic of Texas Senators
1st Congress of the Republic of Texas
1788 births
1866 deaths
People from Duplin County, North Carolina
People of the Texas Revolution
American militiamen in the War of 1812
Grimes County, Texas
Signers of the Texas Declaration of Independence